The 1996 German motorcycle Grand Prix was the eighth round of the 1996 Grand Prix motorcycle racing season. It took place on 7 July 1996 at the Nürburgring.

500 cc classification

250 cc classification

125 cc classification

References

German motorcycle Grand Prix
German
Motorcycle Grand Prix